Fazila Jeewa-Daureeawoo is a Mauritian politician who has served in various ministerial positions as a member of the Militant Socialist Movement. She represents Constituency No. 19 in the National Assembly. She is the first woman to hold the position of Vice Prime Minister.

Legal career
Jeewa-Daureeawoo worked as a solicitor and has appeared in the Supreme Court of Mauritius and its Family Division.

Political career
Jeewa-Daureeawoo was first elected to the National Assembly in the 2005 general election, and held her seat until 2010. She was elected again in the 2014 general election, and was appointed Minister of Social Security, National Solidarity and Reform Institutions until January 2017.

She was then appointed Minister of Gender Equality, Child Development and Family Welfare until November 2017. She then held the honorary title of Vice Prime Minister until November 2019, while also serving as Minister of Local Government and Outer Islands. In July 2018, she became Minister of Gender Equality, Child Development and Family Welfare again after an inquiry accused lawyer and incumbent-minister Roubina Jadoo-Jaunbocus of meeting with jailed drug traffickers who were not her clients.

Following the 2019 general election, she was again appointed to the Ministry of Social Security and National Solidarity as the Minister of Social Integration, Social Security and National Solidarity.

References

Living people
21st-century Mauritian lawyers
Militant Socialist Movement politicians
Women government ministers of Mauritius
Members of the National Assembly (Mauritius)
Vice Prime Ministers of Mauritius
Year of birth missing (living people)
21st-century women politicians